Far Eastern Air Transport Flight 103 was a flight from Taiwan Taipei Songshan Airport to Kaohsiung International Airport that crashed on 22 August 1981, killing all 110 people on board. The Boeing 737-222 aircraft disintegrated in midair and crashed in the township of Sanyi, Miaoli. It is also called the Sanyi Air Disaster. The crash is the third-deadliest aviation accident on the Taiwanese soil, behind China Airlines Flight 676 and China Airlines Flight 611.

Aircraft 

 Aircraft model: Boeing 737-222
 Manufacturing serial number: 19939/151
 Registration: B-2603 (ex United Airlines N9058U)
 Year of manufacture: 1969

Summary 
The aircraft had previously lost cabin pressure on 5 August; and earlier on the day of the crash, it had departed Songshan Airport, but the crew aborted the flight 10 minutes later for the same reason. After repairs were made, the aircraft departed Songshan Airport again bound for Kaohsiung International Airport. At 14 minutes after takeoff, the aircraft suffered an explosive decompression and disintegrated. The nose section landed in Sanyi Township, Miaoli County. Other debris landed in the townships of Yuanli,  Tongluo, and Tongxiao. Of the 110 people on board, 1 passenger was found alive but died on the way to a hospital. In the end, all aboard died. After the accident, due to it occurring in a mountainous region, road traffic was backed up. The remains of the victims were driven to the Shengxing railway station, from where they were transported by train.

Cause 
Although early speculation indicated that the crash was caused by an explosive device, an investigation by the Republic of China Civil Aeronautics Board concluded that severe corrosion led to a pressure-hull rupture. The severe corrosion was due to the many pressurization flight cycles the aircraft had experienced, and that cracks produced were probably undetected.

Victims

Notable victims 

 Kuniko Mukōda, a Japanese TV screenwriter, was heading to Kaohsiung for a festival.

See also 

 Japan Airlines Flight 123
 China Airlines Flight 611
 Aloha Airlines Flight 243
Continental Express Flight 2574
BOAC Flight 781
Chalk's Ocean Airways Flight 101

References

External links 
 Aviation Safety Network 
 Airliners.net Photos of the airline

 UK CAA Document CAA 429 World Airline Accident Summary (ICAO Summary 4/76)

August 1981 events in Asia
1981 in Taiwan
Aviation accidents and incidents in 1981
Aviation accidents and incidents in Taiwan
Accidents and incidents involving the Boeing 737 Original
Airliner accidents and incidents caused by in-flight structural failure
Airliner accidents and incidents caused by maintenance errors
1981 disasters in Taiwan